Una Hora A Tokyo is the third album released by Argentinian rock band Airbag released on October 11, 2008. The album received a Latin Grammy Award nomination for Best Rock Vocal Album, Duo or Group. It was released by Warner Music Group in Argentina, Colombia and Mexico, but compared to their first two albums, "Una Hora a Tokyo" was not a success commercially, since they decided to change the direction and style of the band giving a turn to pop and teens songs (as in their two predecessors) to more rock and complex, and with another sound. And on this album  Guido in the live shows, he leaves the drums and joins the second guitar and on vocals. A national tour was made in 2008 as a promotion although the album took several months to come out, and the album was presented with a tour that began in October 2008 and ended in October 2009.

Track listing 

 All the songs are composed by Patricio Sardelli, Guido Sardelli and Gastón Sardelli.

 ¿Revolución?
 Mi Sensación
 Una Hora a Tokio
 Noches de Abril
 Lo Sentirás
 Lejos del Sol
 Ella No Está
 Un Día Diferente
 Dulce Condena
 Algo en mi Mente
 Sinfonía Eléctrica
 Blues

References

2008 albums
Airbag (band) albums
Spanish-language albums